Michaela Ustorf (born 4 October 1972) is a German gymnast. She competed in five events at the 1988 Summer Olympics.

References

External links
 

1972 births
Living people
German female artistic gymnasts
Olympic gymnasts of West Germany
Gymnasts at the 1988 Summer Olympics
People from Kaufbeuren
Sportspeople from Swabia (Bavaria)